is the 12th major single by the Japanese idol group AKB48, released on June 24, 2009. The single peaked at number 2 in the Oricon weekly singles chart.

It is a Birthday song

Track listing 
The first press of the Regular Edition came with a voting card for the AKB48 election, selecting the members who would participate in the next single, and a handshake event ticket.

Regular Edition 
CD

DVD

Bonus (First press only)
 AKB48 election voting card with a serial number
 Handshake event ticket (Sapporo, Fukuoka, Nagoya, Osaka, Tokyo)

Theater Edition 
CD
See Regular Edition CD

Members 
(Team affiliation at the time of the release.)

Center: Atsuko Maeda
 Team A: Tomomi Itano, Rie Kitahara, Haruna Kojima, Mariko Shinoda, Minami Takahashi, Reina Fujie, Atsuko Maeda, Minami Minegishi, Miho Miyazaki
 Team K: Yūko Ōshima, Erena Ono, Tomomi Kasai, Sae Miyazawa
 Team B: Yuki Kashiwagi, Rino Sashihara, Moeno Nitō, Mayu Watanabe
 Kenkyūsei: Mika Komori
 SKE48: Jurina Matsui, Rena Matsui
It was the first selection for Moeno Nitō. Mika Komori became the first trainee to be selected for an A-side.

Charts

Sales and certifications

Other versions
 The Thai idol group BNK48, a sister group of AKB48, covered the song and named it "Prakai Namta Lae Roiyim" ("Sparkle of Tears and Smiles"). It was included on the group's third single, "Shonichi – Wan Raek", released on 7 May 2018.
The Vietnamese sister idol group SGO48 performed the song in Vietnamese at the AKB48 Group Asia Festival in Shanghai on August 24, 2019.

References 

2009 singles
Songs about birthdays
Songs about birthday parties
Songs with lyrics by Yasushi Akimoto
AKB48 songs
King Records (Japan) singles
BNK48 songs